Thomas Lauder (born 7 January 1918) is a Scottish former ice hockey defender who played in the Scottish National League and the British National League for the Paisley Pirates and the Perth Panthers in the 1940s and 1950s. 

Lauder was born in Johnstone, Scotland on 7 January 1918. He was inducted to the British Ice Hockey Hall of Fame in 1951. Lauder moved to Canada in 1956.

References

Sources
British Ice Hockey Hall of Fame entry

1918 births
Possibly living people
British Ice Hockey Hall of Fame inductees
Paisley Pirates players
People from Johnstone
Scottish ice hockey defencemen
Sportspeople from Renfrewshire